Morgan Township is one of the sixteen townships of Scioto County, Ohio, United States.  The 2010 census counted 2,520 people in the township.

Geography
Located in the northwestern part of the county, it borders the following townships:
Camp Creek Township, Pike County - north
Scioto Township, Pike County - northeast corner
Valley Township - east
Rush Township - south
Union Township - southwest
Brush Creek Township - west
Rarden Township - northwest

No municipalities are located in Morgan Township.

Name and history
Named after settler Thomas Morgan, it is one of six Morgan Townships statewide.

Morgan Township was organized in June 1825.

Government
The township is governed by a three-member board of trustees, who are elected in November of odd-numbered years to a four-year term beginning on the following January 1. Two are elected in the year after the presidential election and one is elected in the year before it. There is also an elected township fiscal officer, who serves a four-year term beginning on April 1 of the year after the election, which is held in November of the year before the presidential election. Vacancies in the fiscal officership or on the board of trustees are filled by the remaining trustees.

References

External links
County website

Townships in Scioto County, Ohio
Townships in Ohio